Bulhary  is a village and municipality in the Lučenec District in the Banská Bystrica Region of Slovakia.

History
In historical records, the village was first mentioned in 1435 (Bolgarom), it is however much older. In the early 16th century it belonged to Filakovo town and afterwards to the landowners Bebek, Serény, Balassa, and Vécsey. From 1554 to 1595 was occupied by Turks. Then it passed to the families Török, Révay, Berchtold and Coburg. From 1939 to 1944 it belonged to Hungary under the First Vienna Award.

Genealogical resources

The records for genealogical research are available at the state archive "Statny Archiv in Banska Bystrica, Slovakia"

 Roman Catholic church records (births/marriages/deaths): 1715-1896 (parish B)
 Lutheran church records (births/marriages/deaths): 1783-1895 (parish B)

See also
 List of municipalities and towns in Slovakia

External links
https://web.archive.org/web/20071217080336/http://www.statistics.sk/mosmis/eng/run.html
http://www.bulhary.ocu.sk/
http://www.e-obce.sk/obec/bulhary/bulhary.html
Surnames of living people in Bulhary

Villages and municipalities in Lučenec District